The Ethiopia national football team (Amharic: የአትዮጵያ ብሔራዊእግር ኳስ ቡድን), nicknamed ዋሊያ, after the Walia, represents Ethiopia in men's international football and is controlled by the Ethiopian Football Federation, the governing body for football in Ethiopia. The team has been representing Ethiopia in regional, continental, and international competitions since its founding in 1943. The Walias play their home games at Addis Ababa Stadium located in the capital city of Addis Ababa. .

Ethiopia was one of only three teams (along with Egypt and Sudan) to participate in the inaugural Africa Cup of Nations in 1957. It won the competition in 1962, while it was also the host. However, success has been elusive since the end of the 1960s. Under coach Sewnet Bishaw, the team qualified for the 2013 Africa Cup of Nations after a 31-year absence.

History

Early history 
Ethiopia has a long football tradition and was among the pioneers of international competition in Africa, playing its first international match in 1947, defeating French Somaliland 5–0. The EFF joined FIFA in 1952, and was one of the founders of the Confederation of African Football in 1957. The team took part in the inaugural African Nations Cup in 1957, where it finished second. In 1959, Ethiopia entered the 1962 World Cup qualifiers for the first time and faced Israel in the second round after a bye. The team lost both games; and with an aggregate score of 2–4 was knocked out of the competition.

The team won the African tournament on home soil, in 1962. Nine countries entered the competition, including the reigning champions, the United Arab Republic, meaning for the first time a qualification tournament was required. As with previous tournaments, the finals only included four teams. The United Arab Republic, as holders, and Ethiopia as hosts, qualified automatically meaning each needed to play only one game to reach the final. Ethiopia won the tournament for the first time after extra time in the final against the United Arab Republic. Mengistu Worku and Badawi Abdel Fattah were joint top-scorers, both with three goals each, but the award itself was given to Worku because his team had won the title. This was the greatest feat ever achieved by the Ethiopian National team, and the only African Cup of Nations title it has ever won. Luciano Vassalo was the team's captain, and the coach was Ydnekatchew Tessema.

In the 1963 African Cup of Nations, they finished fourth, after losing the third place battle against the United Arab Republic. The 1965 edition was even more of a disappointment for Ethiopia, as the national team was eliminated in group phase by Tunisia and Senegal, finishing at the bottom of the group, with only one scored goal.

The next African Cup of Nations was the 1968 edition. Again, but this time on home soil, the team finished in fourth place after losing to the Democratic Republic of the Congo in the semi-finals, and losing the third place match to Ivory Coast 0−1. But two years later, the team went through a real disaster, as they finished at the bottom of the group phase, with a goal difference of 3–12. The worse was yet to come for Ethiopia as they did not qualify for the 1972 African Cup of Nations at all, losing to Kenya in the qualifying tournament with a 0–3 aggregate. Almost the same thing happened for the 1974 African Cup of Nations. This time, they were eliminated by Tanzania.

Ethiopia hosted the Nations Cup tournament in 1976, but failed to progress to the final four, finishing third in the group, behind Guinea and Egypt. In 1977, they played Mauritius in the qualifiers for the 1978 African Cup of Nations. After a 4–2 win on aggregate, they had to play Uganda. After a 0–0 draw from the first match, Uganda won the second match, 2–1, and progressed to the final tournament. They also missed the 1980 African Cup of Nations. Until 2013, Ethiopia last qualified for the tournament in 1982, under coach Mengistu Worku, legendary former player. They failed to make it past the group stage.

Later history (2000–2011)

Earlier success in CECAFA Cup (2001–2007) 

In the 2001 CECAFA Cup, Ethiopia beat Zanzibar 5–0 and tied 1–1 with Rwanda B to advance to the quarterfinals against Burundi. After a 2–2 tie in regulation, they beat Burundi 5–4 in penalty kicks. Ethiopia went on to beat Rwanda A 1–0 in the semi-finals and Kenya 2–1 in the finals to win the championship for the first time since 1987. Because of their success in 2001 with Asrat Haile at the helm, Ethiopia jumped 17 spots in FIFA rankings from 155th to 138th. Despite their success, the EFF chose to replace Asrat with German coach Jochen Figge in August 2002.

In the 2002 CECAFA Cup, Ethiopia failed to qualify past the group stage of the competition; they lost all four of their games against Zanzibar, Uganda, Somalia, and Rwanda. In 2003 CECAFA Cup, Ethiopia withdrew just before the start of the tournament. The competition only had six participating countries with Burundi, Djibouti, Somalia, and Tanzania also choosing not to participate. The EFF fired Figge in May 2003, even though the team had won two games and was second in their group in the 2004 African Cup of Nations qualifiers. Then assistant coach, Asrat was appointed interim coach. Ethiopia failed to qualify by 3 points with a loss in the final game in Guinea. Asrat was soon replaced by Seyoum Kebede whose tenure with the "Walias" was also short lived.

The next challenge was the 2004 CECAFA Cup in Addis Ababa. There were 9 teams in regional tournament: Burundi, Zanzibar, Rwanda, Ethiopia, Tanzania, Sudan, Kenya, Uganda and Somalia. Ethiopia was led by captain Zewdu Bekele, and again by coach Asrat who was recalled to the position a mere two weeks before the beginning of the tournament. After defeating Burundi, tying with Rwanda and beating Tanzania, and Zanzibar, the team advanced to the semi-finals for the first time since 2001. Ethiopia advanced to the championship after a dramatic nail-biting penalty shootout with Kenya. The team went on to beat Burundi 3–0 and win the 2004 CECAFA Cup on 25 December 2004. That night, people all across Addis Ababa sang and danced in the streets.

The Ethiopian national team was the champion of the same CECAFA Cup competition again in 2005, in Kigali, Rwanda. This time coached by Sewnet Bishaw—after a 0–0 draw with Uganda and a 3–1 victory over Sudan—Ethiopia thrashed Djibouti in a 6–0 victory. They then went on to beat Somalia 3–1. Semi-finals saw Ethiopia whip Zanzibar 4–0, with Fikru Tefera scoring a hat-trick. In the final match, Andualem Negusse's goal allowed Ethiopia to take the cup again with a 1–0 win over Rwanda.

The Ethiopian team did not fare as well in the next three appearances at the CECAFA Cup. At the 2006 CECAFA Cup in Addis Ababa, Ethiopia lost to Tanzania but beat Djibouti and Malawi in the group stage to advance to the quarterfinals against Zambia. They lost 0–1 with a very late goal by Zambia's Jonas Sakuwaha in the 87th minute of the game. On 6 December, a CECAFA emergency committee made the extraordinary decision to have the match replayed because referee Issa Kagabi (Rwanda) supposedly had whistled the end of the match prematurely. Zambia announced they would refuse to play Ethiopia again. CECAFA secretary general Nicholas Musonye—not present at the emergency committee meeting—threatened that he'd cancel the entire tournament should match be replayed. Ethiopian Football Federation declined to have the match replayed and graciously withdrew from the tournament.

At 2007 CECAFA Cup, Ethiopia suffered a 1–3 loss to Zanzibar and a hard-fought 0–0 draw with Sudan in which they failed to produce a goal despite star Fikru Tefera's call up. This was enough to eliminate Ethiopia from the tournament.

Suspension and reinstatement (2008–2009) 

In the 2008 African Cup of Nations qualifiers, Ethiopia finished bottom of their group after losing their last two games.

In July 2008, a FIFA Emergency Committee decided to suspend the Ethiopian Football Federation (EFF) due to their failure to comply with the road map to normalize the federation agreed upon in February 2008 by FIFA, CAF and EFF. The road map was established in Feb 2008 following the dismissal of the country's football federation president Ashebir Woldegiorgis by the countries authorities. One of the main points of the road map was the organization of an "extraordinary general assembly" to deal with the "motion of dismissal". In addition, the EFF offices were to be handed over to the recognized leadership of the federation.

The suspension of the EFF came into force on 29 July 2008, the day on which the federation had officially been notified of its suspension. Ethiopia played four group level matches in 2010 FIFA World Cup qualification before FIFA announced the immediate suspension of the Ethiopian Football Federation. On 12 September 2008, FIFA excluded the Ethiopian team from the 2010 World Cup qualifiers and the results of their matches were cancelled. Ethiopia's exclusion from the World Cup also led to their exclusion from the Africa Cup of Nations. While it was not clear if the team was also explicitly excluded from the 2010 Africa Cup of Nations, their failure to complete the remaining fixtures effectively eliminated them from the tournament because the 2010 FIFA World Cup qualification was also used to determine the qualification for 2010 Africa Cup of Nations. The team also missed the 2008 CECAFA Cup due to this suspension.

In July 2009, the EFF was reinstated after organizing the extraordinary general assembly and electing new leaders as instructed by FIFA. FIFA's executive committee had voted a month before to lift the suspension so long as that EFF organized and chaired an elective general assembly. FIFA confirmed that it was satisfied with the election.

Continued troubles (2009–2011) 

At the 2009 CECAFA Cup, Ethiopia defeated Djibouti 5–0, but lost 0–1 to Zambia and 0–2 to Kenya, thus finishing third in the group and getting eliminated from the regional tournament.

At the 2010 CECAFA Cup, in Tanzania, Ethiopia was in Group C with Uganda, Kenya and Malawi. After the 1–2 loss to Uganda, Ethiopia beat Kenya 2–1 and came to a 1–1 draw with Malawi. Next opponent was Zambia, and Ethiopia won 2–1 by two goals. In semi-finals however, they lost to Ivory Coast 0–1. In the third-place battle to follow, they lost 3–4 to Uganda to come in fourth place in the tournament. Tournament's star players and goal scorers were Shimelis Bekele of Awassa City and Oumed Oukri of Defence Force. The team had exceeded fans’ expectations by reaching the semi-final stage.

In April 2011, the Ethiopian Football Federation fired national coach Iffy Onuora – just 9 months after he took charge of the Ethiopian national football team. Ethiopian Football Federation cited disciplinary grounds for his dismissal just a month after the team's 4–0 defeat at the hands of the Nigerian Green Eagles in Group B of the 2012 Africa Cup of Nations qualification in Abuja. The Ethiopian national team had played 11 matches during coach Onuora's tenure, winning 4, drawing in 1 and losing 6 matches. The team scored 12 goals and conceded 21 goals in those matches.

In May 2011, the EFF appointed former Zimbabwe and Namibia manager Tom Saintfiet as coach in place of Iffy Onuora. However, Tom Saintfiet left his job as Ethiopia's national soccer coach after just five months, citing "broken promises" as the reason for his departure. Saintfiet had been in charge for three 2012 African Cup of Nations qualification matches, including a 2–2 draw with Nigeria that contributed to the Super Eagles missing out on 2012 Africa Cup of Nations.

Recent history (2012–present)

2013 African Cup of Nations 

In the qualification for the 2013 Africa Cup of Nations, Ethiopia tied 1–1 with Benin after a goalless draw in the first leg at home to progress to the last round of qualification because of the away goals rule. In the last round of qualification, Ethiopia again won on the away goals rule after a 5–5 draw in aggregate score against Sudan. This qualified Ethiopia to the Africa Cup of Nations for the first time in 31 years.

2014 World Cup qualification 

With a 5–0 aggregate victory over Somalia, Ethiopia joined South Africa, Botswana and Central African Republic (CAR) in Group A. Ethiopia drew 1–1 with South Africa away from home and beat CAR at home 2–0 to top the group after the first two games. They beat Botswana twice, 1–0 on 22 March 2013 at home in Addis Ababa and 2–1 on 7 June in Botswana. However, the 7 June win was later awarded to Botswana by a score of 3–0 after it was discovered that Ethiopia fielded an ineligible player. Still, they beat South Africa 2–1 at home on 16 June and secured Ethiopian advancement to the third round after beating CAR away in their final match, which was considered as a historic achievement for the country. The team eventually was eliminated by Nigeria with two defeats in the Third Round, though it remains as the best performance ever by Ethiopia in any World Cup qualification.

Results and fixtures

2021

2022

2023

Coaching history 
Caretaker manager are listed in italics.

  Edward Virvilis (1950–1954)
  Georg Braun (1954–1956)
  Jiří Starosta (1959)
  Slavko Milošević (1961)
  Ydnekatchew Tessema (1961–1962)
  Slavko Milošević (1962)
  Ydnekatchew Tessema (1963)
  Ferenc Szűcs (1968–1969)
  Luciano Vassalo (1969–1970)
  Adamu Alemu (1970)
  Peter Schnittger (1974–1976)
  Mengistu Worku (1977–1978)
  Mengistu Worku (1980–1982)
  Tilahun Tesfaye (1984)
  Mengistu Worku (1987)
  Klaus Ebbighausen (1987–1989)
  Kassahun Teka (1992–1993)
  Gebregiorgis Getahun (1993)
  Kassahun Teka (1994–1995)
  Seyoum Abate (1996)
  Oko Idiba (1997)
  Kassahun Teka (1997)
  Seyoum Abate (1998–2000)
  Asrat Haile (2001)
  Jochen Figge (2002–2003)
  Asrat Haile (2003)
  Seyoum Kebede (2003–2004)
  Asrat Haile (2004)
  Sewnet Bishaw (2004–2006)
  Seyoum Abate (2006)
  Diego Garzitto (2006–2007)
  Tesfaye Fetene (2007)
  Tsegaye Desta (2007)
  Abraham Teklehaymanot (2008–2010)
  Iffy Onuora (2010–2011)
  Tom Saintfiet (2011)
  Sewnet Bishaw (2011–2014)
  Mariano Barreto (2014–2015)
  Yohannes Sahle (2015–2016)
 Gebremedhin Haile (2016)
 Ashenafi Bekele (2017)
 Abraham Mebratu (2018–2020)
 Wubetu Abate (2020–present)

Players

Current squad 
The following players were called up for the 2023 AFCON qualification matches against Guinea on 24 and 27 March 2023.

Caps and goals correct as of 9 June 2022, after the match against Egypt.

Recent call-ups
The following players have been called up for Ethiopia in the last 12 months.

Records 

Players in bold are still active with Ethiopia.

Most appearances

Top goalscorers

Competitive record

FIFA World Cup

Africa Cup of Nations

Achievements 
Africa Cup of Nations :
1 time Champions (1962)
1 time Runners-up (1957)
1 time Third-place finish (1959)
2 time Fourth-place finish (1963, 1968)
CECAFA Cup :
4 times Champions (1987, 2001, 2004, 2005)
2 time Third-place finish (2000, 2015)
2 time Fourth-place finish (1995, 2010)

Notes

References

External links 

 
 Ethiopian Team Profile at FIFA.com

 
African national association football teams
E
National sports teams established in 1947